Daniele Del Giudice (11 January 1949 – 2 September 2021) was an Italian author and lecturer. He lived in Venice, where he taught theatrical literature at the University Iuav of Venice.

Biography
Born in Rome in 1949, Del Giudice researched avant-garde theatre first in Wrocław, Poland, and later political theatre, focusing on Italian actor Dario Fo. He also worked for various newspapers, becoming an established essayist and literary critic. His first novel in 1983, Lo stadio di Wimbledon (Wimbledon stadium) told the story of writer Roberto Balzen, who gives up writing to lead an active life. The novel was made into a film in 2002. Del Giudice died on 2 September 2021 at the age of 72.

Prizes
Viareggio Prize (1983) (Opera Prima Narrativa)
Bergamo Prize (1986)
Bagutta Prize (1995)
Flaiano Prize (1995)
Selezione Premio Campiello (1995, 1997)
Feltrinelli Prize (2002)
European Union Prize for Literature (2009)

List of works
 Lo stadio di Wimbledon (1983)
 Atlante occidentale (1985) Translated by Norman MacAfee and Luigi Fontanella as Lines of Light (1988)
 Nel museo di Reims (1988)
 Taccuino Australe (1990) A 6-part diary of a journey to Antarctica, published in Corriere della Sera and Frankfurter Allgemeine Zeitung
 Staccando l'ombra da terra (1994) Translated by Joseph Farrell as Takeoff: The Pilot's Lore (1996)
 Mania (1997)
 Orizzonte mobile (2009)

References

External links
Daniele del Giudice biography

1949 births
2021 deaths
Italian male writers
Writers from Rome